The 1962–63 season was the 17th season in FK Partizan's existence. This article shows player statistics and matches that the club played during the 1962–63 season.

Players

Squad information
Player (league matches/league goals)
Vladica Kovačević (26/14)Milutin Šoškić (26/0) (goalkeeper)Milan Galić (25/16)Fahrudin Jusufi (25/0)Velibor Vasović (24/2)Ljubomir Mihajlović (23/0)Milan Vukelić (18/2)Joakim Vislavski (16/7)Zvezdan Čebinac (16/0)Bora Milutinović (15/1)Velimir Sombolac (14/0)Mustafa Hasanagić (12/4)Anton Rudinski (8/6)Aleksandar Jončić (8/0)Ivan Rajić (6/1)Lazar Radović (5/2)Milorad Milutinović (5/0)Ilija Mitić (5/0)Dragomir Slišković (5/0)Branislav Mihajlović (4/1)Mane Bajić (4/0)Miodrag Petrović (3/1)Vladimir Petrović (3/0)Dragoslav Jovanović (2/0)Milan Damjanović (1/0)Zenun BrovinaDimitrije DavidovićPoljanJankulovskiMilanović

Friendlies

Competitions

Yugoslav First League

Yugoslav Cup

European Cup

Preliminary round

Statistics

Goalscorers 
This includes all competitive matches.

Score overview

See also
 List of FK Partizan seasons

References

External links
 Official website
 Partizanopedia 1962-63  (in Serbian)

FK Partizan seasons
Partizan
Yugoslav football championship-winning seasons